Uittienia is a genus of flowering plants in the family Fabaceae. It belongs to the subfamily Dialioideae. It has a single species, Uittienia modesta.

References

Dialioideae
Monotypic Fabaceae genera